Jovan Dučić (15 February 1872 – 7 April 1943) was a Herzegovinian Serb poet-diplomat and academic.

He is one of the most influential Serbian lyricists and modernist poets. Dučić published his first collection of poetry in Mostar in 1901 and his second in Belgrade in 1908. He also wrote often in prose, writing a number of literary essays, studies on writers, letters by poets from Switzerland, Greece and Spain and the book Blago cara Radovana for which he is most remembered when it comes to his writing.

Dučić was also one of the founders of the Narodna Odbrana, a nationalist non-governmental organization in the Kingdom of Serbia and he was a member of the Serbian Royal Academy.

Biography

Early life and diplomacy
Jovan Dučić was born on 17 February 1871 in Trebinje, at the time part of Bosnia Vilayet within the Ottoman Empire.

In Trebinje he attended primary school. He moved on to a high school in Mostar and trained to become a teacher in Sombor. He worked as a teacher in several towns before returning to Mostar, where he founded (with writer Svetozar Ćorović and poet Aleksa Šantić) a literary magazine called Zora (Dawn).

Dučić's openly expressed Serbian patriotism caused difficulties with the authorities – at that time Bosnia and Herzegovina was de facto incorporated into the Austro-Hungarian Empire – and he moved abroad to pursue higher studies, mostly in Geneva and Paris. He was awarded a law degree by the University of Geneva and, following his return from abroad, entered Serbian diplomatic service in 1907. Although he had previously expressed opposition to the idea of creating a Yugoslavia, he became the new country's first ambassador to Romania (in 1937). He had a distinguished diplomatic career in this capacity, serving in Istanbul, Sofia, Rome, Athens, Cairo, Madrid and Lisbon. Dučić spoke several foreign languages and wrote travelogues based on some of his diplomatic posts which were published in his work Cities and Chimeras, such as his time in Egypt where he served as the Kingdom of Serbs, Croats and Slovenes's first chargé d'affaires in that country.

Poetry

It was as a poet that Dučić gained his greatest distinctions. He published his first book of poetry in Mostar in 1901 and his second in Belgrade, 1908. He wrote prose as well: several essays and studies about writers, Blago cara Radovana (Tsar Radovan's treasure) and poetry letters from Switzerland, Greece, Spain and other countries.

Like Šantić, Dučić's work was initially heavily influenced by that of Vojislav Ilić, the leading Serbian poet of the late 19th century. His travels abroad helped him to develop his own individual style, in which the Symbolist movement was perhaps the greatest single influence. In his poetry he explored quite new territory that was previously unknown in Serbian poetry. He restricted himself to only two verse styles, the symmetrical dodecasyllable (the Alexandrine) and hendecasyllable—both French in origin—in order to focus on the symbolic meaning of his work. He expressed a double fear, of vulgarity of thought, and vulgarity of expression.

Personal life
In the autumn of 1893, during the party in the newly built hotel Drina in Bijeljina, a young and ambitious teacher Dučić met recent School of Commerce  graduate Magdalena Živanović. They got engaged with on 5 November 1893, and their correspondence continued even Dučić's departure from Bijeljina to Mostar to teach from 1895 to 1899.

A part of the correspondence is kept safe up to this day, as well as the letter which Dučić's friend and poet Aleksa Šantić redirected to Magdalena on 6 April 1901. year asking for help in collecting a subscription for his songs. Ljiljana Lukić, a retired professor, keeps a personal copy of the correspondence between Dučić and Magdalena.

Professor Ljiljana Lukić states that Dučić lived for a short time in the house of Magdalena Nikolić who lived with her sister. After break up with Dučić, Magdalena shouted that she would never leave home again. "Like a novel heroine, she lived by her memories and the only happy moments she had was in reading the letters and songs of the man she loved", as Professor Lukić concludes. Dučić's secret fiancé left in the amanet the following words to be written after her death on the monument, which are still read today on the Bijeljina graveyard: Maga Nikolić-Živanović, 1874–1957, the poet herself and first inspiration of poet Jovan Dučić.

Twenty years before Magdalena's death, while Dučić was the authorized minister of Kingdom of Yugoslavia, a request was received that testifies of the deep trace which Dučić left in Bijeljina. Singing society Srbadija asked the minister to help in building a home for the needs of society.

The Embassy of Serbia in Hungary is in the house which Jovan Dučić received from a Hungarian woman, and then donated it to the state.

Exile, death and legacy

Dučić went into exile in the United States in 1941 following the German invasion and occupation of Yugoslavia, where he joined his relative Mihajlo (Michael) in Gary, Indiana. From then until his death two years later, he led a Chicago-based organization, the Serbian National Defense Council (founded by Mihailo Pupin in 1914) which represented the Serbian diaspora in the US. During these two years, he wrote many poems, historical books and newspaper articles espousing Serbian nationalist causes and protesting the mass murder of Serbs by the pro-Nazi Ustaše regime of Croatia. In Yugoslav school anthologies immediately after
WWII he had been declared persona non grata and  widely viewed as a Serbian chauvinist.

He died on 7 April 1943. His funeral took place at the Saint Sava Serbian Orthodox Church in Gary, Indiana and he was buried in the Saint Sava Serbian Orthodox Monastery cemetery in Libertyville, Illinois. He expressed a wish in his will to be buried in his home town of Trebinje, a goal which was finally realized when he was reburied there on 22 October 2000 in the newly built Hercegovačka Gračanica monastery.

His Acta Diplomatica (Diplomatic Letters) was published posthumously in the United States (in 1952) and in the former-Yugoslavia (in 1991).

The Jovan Dučić Award is awarded for achievements in poetry and it is awarded every year during the manifestation "Dučić's Night" in Trebinje.

He was elected a member of Parnassos Literary Society.

Orders and decorations

 Member of Serbian Academy of Sciences and Arts
 Order of St. Sava, I class, Kingdom of Yugoslavia
 Order of the Yugoslav Crown, I rank, Kingdom of Yugoslavia
 Order of the Redeemer, II rank, Greece
 Order of the Nile, the great officer rank, Egypt
 Order of the Crown of Italy, the broad sash rank, Kingdom of Italy
 Order of the Star of Romania, I rank, Kingdom of Romania
 Order of the White Lion, the commander cross rank, Czechoslovakia
 Order of Merit of the Kingdom of Hungary, the grand cross rank, Kingdom of Hungary

Works
 Pjesme, knjiga prva, izdanje uredništva Zore u Mostaru, 1901.
 Pesme, Serbian Literary Guild, Kolo XVII, knj. 113. Beograd, 1908.
 Pesme u prozi, Plave legende, pisano u Ženevi 1905. Beograd, 1908.
 Pesme (štampa "Davidović"), Beograd, 1908.
 Pesme, izdanje S. B. Cvijanovića, Beograd, 1911.
 Sabrana dela (I-V), Biblioteka savremenih jugoslovenskih pisaca, Beograd, Narodna prosveta
   * Knj. I   Pesme sunca  (1929)
   * Knj. II  Pesme ljubavi i smrti (1929)
   * Knj. III Carski soneti (1930)
   * Knj. IV  Plave legende (1930)
   * Knj. V   Gradovi i himere (1930)
 Sabrana dela, Knj. VI Blago cara Radovana: knjiga o sudbini, Beograd, izdanje piščevo, 1932.
 Gradovi i himere, (Putnička pisma), Serbian Literary Guild, Kolo XLII, Knj. 294. Beograd, 1940.
 Federalizam ili centralizam: Istina o “spornom pitanju“ u bivšoj Jugoslaviji, Centralni odbor Srpske narodne odbrane u Americi, Čikago, 1942.
 Jugoslovenska ideologija: istina o “jugoslavizmu“, Centralni odbor Srpske narodne odbrane u Americi, Čikago, 1942.
 Lirika, izdanje piščevo, Pitsburg, 1943.
 Sabrana dela, Knj. X Jedan Srbin diplomat na dvoru Petra Velikog i Katarine I – Grof Sava Vladislavić – Raguzinski, Pitsburg, 1943.
 Sabrana dela, Knj. VII-IX (Odabrane strane), selected by J. Đonović and P. Bubreško. Izdanje Srpske narodne odbrane u Americi, Čikago, 1951.
 Sabrana dela, (edited by Meša Selimović and Živorad Stojković), Svjetlost, Sarajevo, 1969.
 Sabrana dela, (edited by Meša Selimović and Živorad Stojković. Pregledao i dopunio Živorad Stojković), BIGZ, Svjetlost, Prosveta, Beograd-Sarajevo, 1989.

References

Sources
 Jovan Skerlić, Istorija nove srpske književnosi (Belgrade, 1921) pages 456–458.

External links
 Works
 Translated works
 Jovan Dučić: Grof Sava Vladislavić

1871 births
1943 deaths
People from Trebinje
Serbs of Bosnia and Herzegovina
Bosnia and Herzegovina male writers
Bosnia and Herzegovina poets
Serbian politicians
Eastern Orthodox Christians from Bosnia and Herzegovina
Poets laureate
Serbian male poets
20th-century Serbian poets
20th-century male writers
20th-century Bosnia and Herzegovina writers
University of Geneva alumni
Burials at Serbian Orthodox monasteries and churches
19th-century Bosnia and Herzegovina writers